JB's may refer to:

The J.B.'s James Brown's backing band
JB's Dudley a club just outside Birmingham, England
JB's Restaurants located in 6 western states
JB (disambiguation)
JBS (disambiguation)